Jakob Huldreich Bachmann (21 November 1843, in Stettfurt – 26 August 1915) was a Swiss politician, President of the Swiss National Council (1895/1896) and President of the Federal Supreme Court (1903/1904).

Works

Further reading

External links 
 
 

1843 births
1915 deaths
People from Frauenfeld District
Swiss Calvinist and Reformed Christians
Liberal Party of Switzerland politicians
Members of the National Council (Switzerland)
Presidents of the National Council (Switzerland)
Federal Supreme Court of Switzerland judges
20th-century Swiss judges